Henry Charles Sturt (9 August 1795 – 14 April 1866), of Crichel House, Dorset, was a British landowner and politician.

Background
Sturt was the son of Charles Sturt (1763–1812), who was the son of Humphrey Sturt and his wife Mary Pitfield, daughter of Charles Pitfield and Dorothy Ashley.

Political career
Sturt was elected to Parliament for Bridport in 1817, a seat he held until 1820. In 1823 he was appointed Sheriff of Dorset and later represented Dorchester in 1830 and Dorset between 1835 and 1846.

Family
Sturt married Lady Charlotte Penelope, daughter of Robert Brudenell, 6th Earl of Cardigan. They had several children, including Henry Sturt, who was elevated to the peerage as Baron Alington in 1876, and Col. Charles Napier Sturt, MP for Dorchester. Sturt died in April 1866, aged 70.

References

External links 
 
 
 

1795 births
1866 deaths
Members of the Parliament of the United Kingdom for English constituencies
Politicians from Dorset
UK MPs 1812–1818
UK MPs 1818–1820
UK MPs 1826–1830 
UK MPs 1835–1837
UK MPs 1837–1841
UK MPs 1841–1847